Orgasmatron may refer to:
fictional orgasm-inducing devices in the 1973 film Sleeper and other works
Orgasmatron (massage device), a head-massage device
Orgasmatron (album), a 1986 album by Motörhead and its title track
"Orgasmatron", a track by Avenue D on the 2004 album Bootleg
The Orgasmatron, a 2010 live music project created by songwriter Guy Chambers